Adrián Gandía (born 19 December 1997) is a Puerto Rican judoka.

He is the gold medallist of the 2020 Pan American Judo Championships in the -81 kg category.

References

External links
 
 Adrián Gandía at the 2019 Pan American Games

1997 births
Living people
Puerto Rican male judoka
Youth Olympic gold medalists for Puerto Rico
Judoka at the 2014 Summer Youth Olympics
Judoka at the 2019 Pan American Games
Pan American Games medalists in judo
Pan American Games bronze medalists for Puerto Rico
Medalists at the 2019 Pan American Games
Judoka at the 2020 Summer Olympics
Olympic judoka of Puerto Rico
21st-century Puerto Rican people